The 2005 Women's Hockey Junior World Cup was the 5th edition of the Women's Hockey Junior World Cup. It was held from 14 to 25 September 2005 in Santiago, Chile.

South Korea won the tournament for the second time after defeating Germany 1–0 in the final. The Netherlands won the third-place match by defeating Australia 2–1 in the third and fourth place playoff.

Qualification
Each continental federation received a number of quotas depending on the FIH World Rankings for teams qualified through their junior continental championships. Alongside the host nation, 16 teams competed in the tournament.

 (defending champions)

Squads

Results
All times are Chile Time (UTC−03:00)

First round

Pool A

Pool B

Pool C

Pool D

Medal round

Pool E

Pool F

Non-Medal Round

Pool G

Thirteenth to sixteenth place classification

Fifteenth and sixteenth place

Thirteenth and fourteenth place

Ninth to twelfth place classification

Crossover

Eleventh and twelfth place

Ninth and tenth place

Fifth to eighth place classification

Crossover

Seventh and eighth place

Fifth and sixth place

First to fourth place classification

Semi-finals

Third and fourth place

Final

Awards

Statistics

Final rankings

Goalscorers

External links

 
Women's Hockey Junior World Cup
International women's field hockey competitions hosted by Chile
Hockey Junior World Cup
Sports competitions in Santiago
Junior World Cup
Hockey Junior World Cup Women
Hockey Junior World Cup
2000s in Santiago, Chile